Sex surrogates, sometimes referred to as surrogate partners, are practitioners trained in addressing issues of intimacy and sexuality. A surrogate partner works in collaboration with a sex therapist to meet the goals of their client. This triadic model is used to dually support the client: the client engages in experiential exercises and builds a relationship with their surrogate partner while processing and integrating their experiences with their therapist or clinician.

Overview
The modality in which surrogate partners work is called Surrogate Partner Therapy. This modality is used to address obstacles to physical and emotional intimacy that a client is unable to resolve through traditional therapy and requires the involvement of a partner. Clients’ presenting issues have commonly included sexual dysfunctions, lack of healthy intimate experiences, or traumatic history.

History
Masters and Johnson introduced the practice in their book Human Sexual Inadequacy, published in 1970. They believed that people could learn about sexual intimacy only by experiencing it.  In their research, subjects that were partnered used these partners to aid in a series of exercises designed to help overcome sexual dysfunction.  Unpartnered subjects were paired with "surrogates" who would take the place of a partner, work under the direction of a trained therapist, and act as a form of mentor for the client. In their research, all of the surrogates were women who were assigned to work with single men. Today, most surrogates are women, but a few are men.
The practice of Surrogate Partner Therapy reached its peak in the early 1980s with a few hundred surrogate partners practicing in the U.S. Since then, Surrogate Partner Therapy's popularity declined but reentered social consciousness after the 2012 film The Sessions, which depicts one surrogate partner's work with a disabled man. As of 2014, those practicing Surrogate Partner Therapy were still very few in number.

Typical problems
Patients frequently present with these specific problems:

 Communication problems
 Dating anxiety
 Lack of confidence
 Lack of experience
 Low sexual desire
 Physical disability
 Sexual inhibitions
 Trouble with intimacy

 Erectile dysfunction
 Genital pain
 History of sexual assault or sexual abuse
 Inability to ejaculate with a partner
 Premature ejaculation
 Sexual aversion disorder
 Vaginismus

There are people who have experienced a change in sexual lifestyle due to an acquired disability (accident, paralysis, disease, trauma), and a surrogate can help them explore and develop sexual potential. The causes of sexual concerns are numerous and the methods a surrogate might use to help improve a client's sexual life are varied.

The Process 
The course of this therapy involves continued communication with both the therapist and the Surrogate Partner. The therapist is responsible for addressing the client's concerns and helping them explore ways to overcome their sexual problems through talk therapy. If the therapist and client deem it necessary that they need additional assistance, they can explore the option of working with a Sexual Surrogate Partner. Therapists are limited only to talk therapy, which is why a Surrogate Partner can be beneficial in helping address the client's concerns through exposure therapy, with no limitations of touch. The therapist is responsible for relaying critical information and treatment goals to the Surrogate Partner for the meeting with the client, so that they may fully address their concerns during the interaction. The therapist, surrogate partner, and client work together to create their course of a treatment plan, the interaction between the client and the Surrogate Partner is essentially for the client to practice what they've learned with their therapist through talk therapy.

The Four Phases of Sexual Surrogate Therapy 
The methodology of this therapy is described to have four phases to achieve a successful treatment:

 Emotional connection
 Sensuality
 Sexuality
 Closure

The first step in Surrogate Partner Therapy is for the surrogate to verbally create an emotional connection and bond with the client, to create a safe environment and address any boundaries and expectations. During this step, the surrogate and client can get to know each other as individuals and create a meaningful relationship. This first step is essential in making the client feel comfortable in pursuing this new type of therapy and laying a good foundation for practicing emotional intimacy.

The next step involves exploring the client's sexuality. This step can involve physical touch and nudity to help the client overcome their sexual concerns, but would not involve sexual arousal or interaction between one another. In this step, the surrogate can work on exercises with the client to feel comfortable in their own body and next to someone else's body, this can involve hugging, or cuddling.

In the third step, the surrogate and client focus on sexuality, this can involve:

 Physical touch
 Sexual arousal
 Sexual contact
 Oral-Genital Stimulation
 Sexual intercourse

The fourth step is closure, to close out the therapy once all parties are satisfied with the results.

Therapy 
Since sexual problems are often psychological rather than physical, communication plays a key role in the therapeutic process between a patient and the surrogate partner, as well as between the surrogate partner and the therapist.
Surrogate partners offer therapeutic exercises to help the patient. These may include, but are not limited to relaxation techniques, sensate focusing, communication, establishing healthy body image, teaching social skills, sex education, as well as sensual and some sexual touching.  Surrogate partner therapy begins with a meeting between the client, therapist, and surrogate partner in which the goals of the client are discussed and the scope/duration of the therapy are established.  Throughout the process, communication between surrogate partner-client, client-therapist, and surrogate partner-therapist is maintained.

Some couples attend surrogate partner therapy sessions together, while some people (either single or in a couple) attend them alone. The surrogate engages in education and often intimate physical contact and/or sexual activity with clients to achieve a therapeutic goal. Some surrogates work at counseling centers, while others have their own offices.

Articles
The 2003 Salon.com article "I was a middle-aged virgin", by Michael Castleman, discusses a middle-aged American virgin (Roger Andrews) and his therapy with the sex surrogate Vena Blanchard.

Documentaries
 The 1985 documentary Private Practices: The Story of a Sex Surrogate explored the relationship between a sex surrogate (Maureen Sullivan), her clients, and her clients' therapists.
 The Discovery Fit & Health documentary My Sex Surrogate, first aired in 2013, follows a woman and a man as they each work with a sex surrogate. The sex surrogate who worked with the man was Cheryl Cohen-Greene.
 The National Geographic show Taboos episode "Forbidden Love" (Season 7, Episode 6, first aired 2011) featured a professional sex surrogate (Cheryl Cohen-Greene) in one of its segments.
 This Is Life with Lisa Ling dedicated an episode to "Sexual Healing" (Season 4, Episode 1).

In popular culture

 In a 1977 episode of Barney Miller titled “Sex Surrogate”, a woman shoots her husband for seeing a sex surrogate.
 My Therapist (1984), an American TV movie starring Marilyn Chambers, is about a sex surrogate. It was based on her one-woman show Sex Surrogate, which in 1979 caused controversy in Vegas as it featured full-frontal nudity, which was banned from all casinos. In 1983, that one-woman show was spun off into a 26-part syndicated soap opera called Love Ya Florence Nightingale. It was broadcast on cable television channels such as the Playboy Channel.
 In the episodes "Party Girl (Part 1)" and "Party Girl (Part 2)" of Season 9 of Night Court, both first aired in 1992, the character Dan works as a sex surrogate after meeting a woman (in Part 1) who is one. 
 In the Season 3 (2006) premiere of Boston Legal, titled, "Can't We All Get a Lung?," Aspergian attorney Jerry Espenson sees sexual surrogate Joanna Monroe (Jane Lynch) at his counsel and compadre Alan Shore's (James Spader) behest.
 The Israeli movie Surrogate (2008) is about a female sex surrogate (Lana Ettinger) treating a man (Amir Wolf) who was sexually abused as a child. The film was directed by Tali Shalom-Ezer and is based on research at Dr. Ronit Aloni's clinic in Tel Aviv.
 In Franklin & Bash (2011-2014), the character of Peter Bash's mother, played by Jane Seymour, is a sex surrogate.
 The American movie The Sessions (2012) stars Helen Hunt as Cheryl, a sexual surrogate who helps polio survivor Mark (John Hawkes) lose his virginity at the age of 38, based on the true story of Mark O'Brien and Cheryl Cohen-Greene. O'Brien wrote about his experience in 1990.
 In an episode of Anger Management, "Charlie and the Virgin" (2013), a friend of Kate (Selma Blair) is a 32-year-old virgin who is looking for her first-time sexual encounter with a man. Charlie Goodson (Charlie Sheen) decides to be her first encounter as a faux sex surrogate (not being professional or licensed), and she becomes attached to him. Later on she finds out that he (Charlie) was taking the place of a professional sex surrogate for a real one provided to her.
 In the American movie Her (2013), Theodore engages with a sexual surrogate in order to bond more closely with his girlfriend Samantha, who is an artificial intelligence software.
 The American movie She's Lost Control (2014) is about the professional and personal life of a sexual surrogate.
 In season 1 episode 10 of Backstrom (2015), "Love Is a Rose and You Better Not Pick It", the S.C.U. investigates when a young female sex surrogate is found dead.
 Masters of Sex episodes 03-07 and 03-08, "Monkey Business" and "Surrogates" (both 2015) feature sexual surrogacy; the show is a TV series based on the work of Masters and Johnson.

See also
 Somatic experiencing
 Sex therapy
 Sex work
 Sexual assistance
 Sexual dysfunction

References

External links
 
 Sex Surrogates: A Clarification of Their Functions Raymond J. Noonan, PhD, SexQuest/The Sex Institute, NYC. Master's thesis for New York University, February 1984.

Sex therapy
Sex workers